The United States men's national football team may refer to:

United States national American football team, men's national American football team
United States men's national Australian rules football team, men's national Australian rules football team
United States men's national soccer team, men's national association football team